Bone removal may refer to:
Ostectomy
Digital bone removal in volume rendering